Helmut Koppelstätter (15 February 1930 – May 1991) was an Austrian backstroke swimmer. He competed in the men's 100 metre backstroke at the 1952 Summer Olympics.

References

External links
 

1930 births
1991 deaths
Olympic swimmers of Austria
Swimmers at the 1952 Summer Olympics
Place of birth missing
Austrian male backstroke swimmers